Esfarayen (also Romanized as Esfarāyen; formerly, Meyanābād, Mīānābād, and Mīyānābād) is a city and capital of Esfarayen County, North Khorasan Province in Iran.  At the 2011 census its population was 60,372 persons in 17,334 families.

The majority of the population is Kurdish, with a significant population of Tats and Turkmens.

Location 
Esfarayen city is the center of Esfarayen County. This city is neighboring with Sabzevar city from the south and southeast, with Farooj from the northeast, with Shirvan from the north and with Bojnourd from the west, and is located in the southern margin of Aladagh mountains along the eastern stretch of Alborz mountain range. The height of Esfarayen city is 1260 meters above sea level.

Culture and customs

Ethnicities 
The Kurmanji-speaking Kurds are the main inhabitants of the city of Esfarayen and constitute the majority of the population of this city. According to Javadzadeh (2001), the people of Esfarayen are composed of 4 ethnic groups, including the Tatas (Persians), the Turks of Khorasan, the Kurds of Kermanshah, the Hazaras (Barbarians).

Universities and higher education centers 
Esfarayen is a university city in northeastern Iran, and in recent years, with the establishment of several universities, the student population of this city has grown. 

Higher education centers in Esfarayen:

Esfarayen University of Technology

Esfarayen Higher Education Complex

Islamic Azad University of Esfarayen

Esfarayen University of Medical Sciences

References

Sources 
 

Cities in North Khorasan Province
Populated places in Esfarayen County
Nishapur Quarter
Kurdish settlements in Iran